Albert Laszlo was formerly the principal bass of the Columbus Symphony Orchestra, formerly faculty of the Juilliard School College and Pre-College Divisions as well as the College-Conservatory of Music (University of Cincinnati), and is currently faculty at the University of New Mexico.

Degrees and studies
He holds B.M. and M.M. degrees From the Juilliard School, where he was a scholarship student of the late Homer Mensch.

Biography
At the age of 12, Laszlo began early training on the violin and began bass studies. He studied cello with George Neikrug and Stephen Kates and was a scholarship student of Homer Mensch at Juilliard as well as a fellowship student of Eugene Levinson at the Aspen Music School. He served as the principal bass of both the National Chamber Orchestra and I Soloisti, both of New York.

In 1985, he became the principal bass of the Columbus Symphony Orchestra (CSO) and has also appeared as a featured soloist with the CSO. Since 1992, he has performed chamber music with members of the CCM faculty both in Cincinnati and Merkin Hall in New York. He joined the Aspen Music Festival artist-faculty in 1994 where he serves as principal bass of the Aspen Chamber Symphony and performs chamber music with other members of the Aspen artist-faculty. He also appears frequently in recitals with his wife, pianist Patricia Wood.

External links
Faculty Description on Juilliard Website

Classical double-bassists
American educators
Aspen Music Festival and School alumni
Aspen Music Festival and School faculty
Living people
Year of birth missing (living people)
Juilliard School alumni
Juilliard School faculty
21st-century double-bassists